The 1996 Tri Nations Series was the inaugural Tri Nations Series, a rugby union competition contested by the men's national teams of Australia, New Zealand and South Africa. It was contested from 6 July to 10 August. New Zealand won all four of their matches to claim the title, as well as retaining the Bledisloe Cup won the previous year for their two wins over Australia.

Table

Results

References

External links
Tri Nations at Rugby.com.au

1996
1996 in South African rugby union
1996 in New Zealand rugby union
1996 in Australian rugby union
1996 rugby union tournaments for national teams